Harry Francis may refer to:
 Harry S. Francis, Prince Edward Island politician
 Harry Denyer Francis, British Columbia politician